Benjamin Edward Murphy (born Benjamin Edward Castleberry Jr., March 6, 1942) is an American actor. He is best known for his role as Kid Curry in the ABC television series Alias Smith and Jones.

Early life
Murphy was born in Jonesboro, Arkansas to Nadine (née Steele) and Benjamin E. Castleberry. When his mother remarried in 1956, Ben was adopted by his stepfather, Patrick Henry Murphy. Murphy grew up in Clarendon Hills, Illinois, a suburb of Chicago.

An alumnus of St. Procopius Academy in Lisle, Illinois, predecessor to today's Benet Academy, he attended eight colleges before deciding to pursue an acting career.

He has a son, Joshua Spriestersbach, from his relationship with Suzanne Bardin.

Career

Murphy appeared in a supporting role in The Name of the Game, a series featuring a rotating leading cast including Tony Franciosa, Gene Barry, and Robert Stack. Murphy played a semi regular role as 'Joseph Sample' assistant to Robert Stack's leading character 'Dan Farrell' in Stack's segments of the show.

From 1971–73, he starred in Alias Smith and Jones with  Pete Duel (1971–72) and Roger Davis (1972–73).  After Alias Smith and Jones, Murphy joined Lorne Greene in the 1973 ABC crime drama Griff. He played detective S. Michael "Mike" Murdock, assistant to Greene's character, Wade "Griff" Griffin, a Los Angeles retired police officer turned private eye. The series had some notable guest stars but folded after thirteen weeks.

In the 1983–84 season, Murphy co-starred with Marshall Colt in the ABC drama series Lottery!. Murphy played Patrick Sean Flaherty, the man who informed lottery winners of their stroke of fortune, and Colt, formerly with James Arness on NBC's short-lived crime drama, McClain's Law, portrayed the Internal Revenue Service agent, Eric Rush, who made sure the winners pay the U.S. government up front.

In 1985, Murphy co-starred as department store heir, Paul Berrenger, on the short-lived drama, Berrenger's. His character was at odds with his former wife, Gloria (Andrea Marcovicci) and his own father, Simon (Sam Wanamaker) due to his romance with executive, Shane Bradley (Yvette Mimieux).

Murphy starred in his own series Gemini Man, in which he played a secret agent who could become invisible for 15 minutes a day through the use of a special wristwatch. The show did not run beyond a single season. Murphy has since appeared in guest-starring parts, including a murder suspect in CBS's Cold Case.

Since the 1980s, when Murphy became a highly ranked tournament tennis player in California, he has continued to travel and compete on the USTA singles and doubles circuit and in celebrity events.

Filmography

References

External links

1942 births
Living people
Benet Academy alumni
People from Clarendon Hills, Illinois
Male actors from Chicago
People from Hinsdale, Illinois
People from Jonesboro, Arkansas